Dudley Joseph "Buzz" Emick Jr. (September 17, 1939 – October 25, 2014) was an American attorney and politician who served as a member of the Virginia Senate and House of Delegates.

References

External links 
 

1939 births
2014 deaths
Democratic Party Virginia state senators
20th-century American politicians